The New York Subliners are an American professional Call of Duty League (CDL) esports team based in New York City, New York. The team is owned by NYXL, an esports organization owned by Sterling Equities subsidiary Sterling.VC. New York was announced as one of the first five cities to own a spot in the CDL.

History

Call of Duty: Modern Warfare 
NYSL entered the CDL with high expectations due to their veteran filled lineup led by ZooMaa. These expectations were halted quickly, with the team suffering frequent losses at the Launch Weekend event. The underperforming continued into the following events for the Subliners, ultimately leading to the team's first roster change; in which they acquired "Mack".

This new addition of Mack also brought along a new energy to the team, one ready to compete. This is exactly what they did when they defeated fan-favorite Chicago Huntsmen during week 6, winning in a unanimous 3-0 fashion. Success managed to just elude the reach of the team for the remainder of the season, as they went on to an anticlimactic finish of 5th in the league overall.

Current roster

Roster controversy 
The Subliners faced obstacles early with team composition. This came in January 2021 when Tommy 'ZooMaa' Paparatto, veteran Call of Duty professional and league starter shockingly announced his retirement. The team responded with the addition of amateur player, Conor 'Diamondcon' Johst to fill this position.

References

External links
 

Venture capital-funded esports teams
Esports teams based in the United States
Call of Duty League teams
Esports teams established in 2019
NYXL